Pandosia was the name of several ancient cities, including:

Pandosia (Epirus), in Epirus, Greece
Pandosia (Bruttium), in Bruttium (now Acri or Castrolibero), Italy
Pandosia (Lucania), in Lucania (now Tursi), Italy